Vera Fogwill (born 28 November 1972 in Buenos Aires) is an Argentine film  and television actress, film director, and screenplay writer, active in the cinema of Argentina.

She is the daughter of Rodolfo Enrique Fogwill.

Her first film as a director is "Las mantenidas sin sueños" ("Kept and Dreamless") in which Fogwill also plays the leading role, of a drug-addicted mother.

Filmography
Acting  
 ¿Quién es Alejandro Chomski? (corto/short subject), subject of an interview
 El Censor (1995)  aka The Eyes of the Scissors
 Evita (1996)
 Buenos Aires Vice Versa (1996), Daniela
 Plaza de almas (1997)
 El Viento se llevó lo qué (1998) aka Wind with the Gone, Soledad
 Las Mantenidas Sin Sueños (2005), Florencia
 Chile 672 (2006), nurse

Directing
 Las Mantenidas Sin Sueños (2005)

Screenwriter
 Horizontal/Vertical (2008)
 Las Mantenidas Sin Sueños (2005)

Television
 Canto rodado (escuela de arte) (1993) TV Series
 Vulnerables (1999) TV Series
 Mujeres Asesinas (2006) TV Series

References

External links
 

1972 births
Argentine film actresses
Argentine women film directors
Argentine screenwriters
Living people